Dragoslav Stepanović (born 30 August 1948) is a Serbian retired football player and coach.

Club career 
Stepanović made his name with OFK Beograd where he was a right back fixture for 11 years between 1962 and 1973, before moving on to Red Star Belgrade for three seasons until 1976. Due to the transfer age restrictions in SFR Yugoslavia he had to wait until 28 years of age to move abroad.

Stepanović's first stop abroad was Bundesliga with Eintracht Frankfurt where he became affectionately known as Steppi. He played in Frankfurt for two seasons (1976–1978). Next came a one-season stint with Wormatia Worms.

In July 1979 he joined English club Manchester City F.C. for £140,000, and spent two seasons there.

He finished out his career back in Germany with Wormatia Worms in 1981–82 season.

International career 
Stepanović is a former Yugoslav international, and used to be a favourite of national team head coach Vujadin Boškov.

International goals
Scores and results list Yugoslavia's goal tally first, score column indicates score after each Stepanović goal.

Coaching career 
Stepanović went on to become a successful football coach in Germany. He made a managerial name for himself in Germany with Eintracht Frankfurt before taking over at Bayer Leverkusen, replacing Reinhard Saftig shortly before they won the 1993 DFB-Pokal Final. He was then signed to coach Athletic Bilbao in July 1995. He did not last until the end of the season, however, getting replaced in mid-March 1996.

He was idolized in the US and finally came to Columbus, Ohio, in 2002 to coach the youth soccer club Blast FC. He has since returned to Germany, where he for a brief spell was team manager at TuS Koblenz.

In December 2006, Stepanović was a short-list candidate for the Bosnia-Herzegovina national team coaching spot, but the job went to Fuad Muzurović instead.

On 24 August 2007, Stepanović was named the head coach of the Serbian Superliga club FK Čukarički. His appointment came two weeks into the 2007–08 season during which Čukarički already played the Serbian powerhouses Red Star Belgrade and Partizan, managing a draw and a loss respectively, On 8 December 2008, he was fired by Čukarički.

During the summer 2009 off season on 8 June 2009, he was named FK Vojvodina head coach for the upcoming 2009–10 season but he was released on 2 October 2009.

References

External links
 Reprezentacija.rs profile
 Dragoslav Stepanović at eintracht-archiv.de 

1948 births
Living people
People from Rekovac
Yugoslav footballers
Serbian footballers
Association football defenders
Yugoslavia international footballers
OFK Beograd players
Red Star Belgrade footballers
Eintracht Frankfurt players
Yugoslav First League players
Bundesliga players
English Football League players
Manchester City F.C. players
Yugoslav football managers
Serbian football managers
La Liga managers
Bundesliga managers
2. Bundesliga managers
AEK Athens F.C. managers
Bayer 04 Leverkusen managers
Eintracht Frankfurt managers
Kickers Offenbach managers
Athletic Bilbao managers
1. FC Lokomotive Leipzig managers
FK Vojvodina managers
Stuttgarter Kickers managers
Zamalek SC managers
SV Eintracht Trier 05 managers
Guangzhou City F.C. managers
FK Čukarički managers
FK Laktaši managers
Serbian expatriate footballers
Serbian expatriate football managers
Yugoslav expatriate sportspeople in Germany
Expatriate footballers in West Germany
Expatriate football managers in Germany
Yugoslav expatriate sportspeople in England
Expatriate footballers in England
Yugoslav expatriate sportspeople in Spain
Expatriate football managers in Spain
Serbian expatriate sportspeople in Greece
Expatriate football managers in Greece
Serbian expatriate sportspeople in China
Expatriate football managers in China
Expatriate football managers in West Germany
Yugoslav expatriate sportspeople in West Germany